The hooded tanager (Nemosia pileata) is a species of bird in the tanager family Thraupidae.
It is found in Argentina, Bolivia, Brazil, Colombia, French Guiana, Guyana, Paraguay, Peru, and Venezuela.
Its natural habitats are subtropical or tropical moist lowland forest, subtropical or tropical mangrove forest, and heavily degraded former forest.

The hooded tanager was described by the French polymath Georges-Louis Leclerc, Comte de Buffon in 1779 in his Histoire Naturelle des Oiseaux from a specimen collected in Cayenne, French Guiana. The bird was also illustrated in a hand-coloured plate engraved by François-Nicolas Martinet in the Planches Enluminées D'Histoire Naturelle which was produced under the supervision of Edme-Louis Daubenton to accompany Buffon's text.  Neither the plate caption nor Buffon's description included a scientific name but in 1783 the Dutch naturalist Pieter Boddaert coined the binomial name Tanagra pileata in his catalogue of the Planches Enluminées. The hooded tanager is now placed in the genus Nemosia that was introduced by the French ornithologist Louis Jean Pierre Vieillot in 1816 with the hooded tanager as the type species. The genus name is from the Ancient Greek nemos meaning "glade" or "dell". The specific pileata is from the Latin pileatus meaning "-capped".

Six subspecies are recognised:
 N. p. hypoleuca Todd, 1916 – north Colombia and north Venezuela
 N. p. surinamensis Zimmer, JT, 1947 – Guyana and Suriname
 N. p. pileata (Boddaert, 1783) – French Guiana through central Brazil to north Bolivia
 N. p. interna Zimmer, JT, 1947 – north central Brazil
 N. p. nana von Berlepsch, 1912 – northeast Peru and west Brazil
 N. p. caerulea (zu Wied-Neuwied, 1831) – east and south Brazil, southeast Peru to east Bolivia, Paraguay and north Argentina

References

External links
Xeno-canto: audio recordings of the hooded tanager
Hooded Tanager: Photos from "Avifauna of the Interior of Ceará, Brasil"

hooded tanager
Birds of South America
hooded tanager
Taxonomy articles created by Polbot